William Wirt Henry (February 14, 1831 – December 5, 1900) was a Virginia lawyer and politician, historian and writer, a biographer of Patrick Henry, his grandfather, and who served in both houses of the Virginia General Assembly, and was president of The Virginia Bar Association and the American Historical Association.

Biography
Born at Red Hill in Charlotte County, Virginia, Henry graduated from the University of Virginia, and was admitted to the bar in 1853. He served in the Confederate Army. After the War, he moved his practice to Richmond in 1873, and specialized in appellate advocacy, and was elected two terms in the Virginia House of Delegates and a term in the Senate of Virginia.  He was a charter member of the Virginia Society of the Sons of the American Revolution and served as its first president from 1890 to 1897.

Henry served as president of the American Historical Association in 1891, and was president of the Virginia Historical Society for 1891–1892. Henry collected and wrote a three-volume work, Patrick Henry: Life, Correspondence and Speeches, of which the first volume was first published in 1891. Henry also wrote on the trials of Aaron Burr and Jefferson Davis. He also wrote widely cited articles about Captain John Smith and Sir Walter Raleigh.  Henry was elected a member of the American Antiquarian Society in 1893.

Henry served as president of The Virginia Bar Association in 1896–1897, and was a vice-president of the American Bar Association, which included his obituary in its annual report for 1900. Henry received honorary law degrees from both the College of William & Mary and Washington & Lee University.

He died at his home in Richmond on December 5, 1900.

References

External links
 

1831 births
1900 deaths
Virginia lawyers
Members of the Virginia House of Delegates
Virginia state senators
Presidents of the American Historical Association
19th-century American politicians
19th-century American historians
19th-century American lawyers
American male non-fiction writers
People from Charlotte County, Virginia
Writers from Virginia
University of Virginia alumni
Confederate States Army personnel
People of Virginia in the American Civil War
19th-century American male writers
Members of the American Antiquarian Society
American people of English descent
American people of Scottish descent